"Long-Legged Guitar Pickin' Man" is a song written by Johnny Cash's bass player Marshall Grant and originally recorded by the duo of Johnny Cash and June Carter.

Released in May 1967 as a single (Columbia 4-44158, with "You'll Be All Right" on the opposite side), the track was also included on the album Carryin' On with Johnny Cash & June Carter that appeared in August.

The song peaked at number six on U.S. Billboard country chart for the week of August 19, 1967.

Track listing

Charts

References

External links 
 "Long-Legged Guitar Pickin' Man" on the Johnny Cash official website

Johnny Cash songs
June Carter Cash songs
1967 songs
1967 singles
Songs written by Marshall Grant
Columbia Records singles